Martin Fowler (18 December 1963) is a British software developer, author and international public speaker on software development, specialising in object-oriented analysis and design, UML, patterns, and agile software development methodologies, including extreme programming.

His 1999 book Refactoring popularised the practice of code refactoring. In 2004 he introduced a new architectural pattern, called Presentation Model (PM).

Biography 
Fowler was born and grew up in Walsall, England, where he went to Queen Mary's Grammar School for his secondary education. He graduated at University College London in 1986. In 1994 he moved to the United States, where he lives near Boston, Massachusetts in the suburb of Melrose.

Fowler started working with software in the early 1980s. Out of university in 1986 he started working in software development for Coopers & Lybrand until 1991. In 2000 he joined ThoughtWorks, a systems integration and consulting company, where he serves as Chief Scientist.

Fowler has written nine books on the topic of software development. He is a member of the Agile Alliance and helped create the Manifesto for Agile Software Development in 2001, along with 16 fellow signatories. He maintains a bliki, a mix of blog and wiki. He popularised the term Dependency Injection as a form of Inversion of Control.

Publications 
 1996. Analysis Patterns: Reusable Object Models. Addison-Wesley. .
 1997. UML Distilled: A Brief Guide to the Standard Object Modeling Language. Addison-Wesley. .
 1999. Refactoring: Improving the Design of Existing Code, With Kent Beck, John Brant, William Opdyke, and Don Roberts (June 1999). Addison-Wesley. .
 2000. Planning Extreme Programming. With Kent Beck. Addison-Wesley. .
 2002. Patterns of Enterprise Application Architecture. With David Rice, Matthew Foemmel, Edward Hieatt, Robert Mee, and Randy Stafford. Addison-Wesley. .
 2010. Domain-Specific Languages. With Rebecca Parsons. Addison-Wesley. .
 2012. NoSQL Distilled: A Brief Guide to the Emerging World of Polyglot Persistence. With Pramod Sadalage. Addison-Wesley. .
 2013. Refactoring: Ruby Edition. With Kent Beck, Shane Harvie, and Jay Fields. Addison-Wesley. .
 2018. Refactoring: Improving the Design of Existing Code, Second Edition. Kent Beck, and Martin Fowler. Addison-Wesley. .

Domain-specific languages 
In his book, Domain-specific languages, Fowler discusses Domain-specific languages, DSL.  DSLs are said to be defined by being composable programming languages, with their focus on an individual domain and having limited expressively. It is argued that DSLs can increase productivity by removing the requirement of the programmer to understand a full programming language, providing a means of communication with domain experts, and separate the manner of execution of a task from the definition of a task itself. These benefits are set against the cost of learning a new language and building the tools for this language, siloing that results for different languages and the abstractions used in DSLs not being suitable for a task.

Fowler introduces the concept of internal (or embedded) and external DSL, an internal DSL being a DSL that is a subset of another language and can be executed by the tools for this outer language. Ruby and Lisp are given as an example of languages where internal DSLs are common. He also introduces the idea of Semantic Model which defines the execution of a DSL. Various examples of DSLs are presented including graphviz, a language for specifying graphs to be rendered; JMock, a java mocking framework; CSS, a language to specify stylistic elements of a website; HQL, an object relational mapper in Java; XAML, a language used to specify and change graphical user interfaces; FIT, a language to express testing scenarios; and make, a tool to build software

The book discusses implementing an external DSL using tools like parsers, lexers, abstract syntax trees and code generation referred to as "syntax-driven translation" This is contrasted with "delimiter-driven translation" which is said to be simpler but less powerful. Here the language is simple enough to be interpreted by splitting on delimiters and switching logic based on individual entries.

Ways of implementing internal DSLs is discussed, with attention paid to nested function calls, sequences of function calls, or method chaining amongst other methods.

References

External links 

 
 

Living people
1963 births
Alumni of University College London
British software engineers
British bloggers
British technology writers
Extreme programming
People from Walsall
People educated at Queen Mary's Grammar School
British expatriates in the United States
Agile software development